2012 Light Years from Home is the seventh studio release by Brazilian progressive rock Apocalypse.

2012 Light Years from Home was released in The 25th Anniversary Box Set that also has a live CD called Magic Spells, a DVD called The 25th Anniversary Concert and a book written by Eliton Tomasi called The 25th Anniversary Book – The Apocalypse History that tells the 25 years band's history.

Tracks
New Sunrise opens immediately with a barrage of melodic vocals in the chorus, with a modern Yes vibe. Although the band are from Brazil all the vox are English, rather than in Portuguese as some other releases were. Eloy Fritsch's keyboards add a symphonic texture, and there are some dynamic guitars from Ruy Fritsch. The rhythms are usually straight forward, not intricate like Threshold, and they are well performed by Eloy Fritsch on bass and Fabio Schneider on drums.

Set me Free continues the symphonic rock style and there is an infectious riff and some labyrinthine passages of keyboard. The vocals again have that Gillan sound, and are easy on the ears, every word is discernible. Take my Heart features the flute playing of Demarchi, that sounds like Ian Anderson hijacked the studio for a few moments. The Angel and Seven Trumpets is a reference to the book of Revelation in the Bible, and it rocks along with a nice tempo.

On the Way to the Stars has a scorching lead guitar break from Ruy Fritsch and 'Till Another Side' has a fabulous shimmering organ sound and some delightful acoustics; one of the quietest songs with a melancholy atmosphere. Demarchi's vocals are excellent maintaining a strong high register and always integral to the melodies woven in the tapestry of guitars and keys. Morning Light opens with those Yes like harmonies before the music chimes in with a soaring lead break and very slow tempo. The lyrics in the infectious chorus are effective; "Our sun is coming out to shine again, come and take my hand to be free, Morning light, the magic horizon will come, take my hand and we'll be in a dream."

Find me Now is a short ballad style song reminding me of Whitesnake, and it is followed by majestic AOR rock style with 'A Cry in the Infinity'. A strange soundwave of a clock chiming, soldiers marching and aeroplanes soaring above, followed by guns and grenades exploding leads to the opening acoustics on To Kiss the Tears You Cry. After such a powerful intro it settles into a melancholy approach, almost sounding like 80s AOR like Survivor or Journey. Ruy's wailing lead break further augments the emotive lyrics; "I'm here, close enough to kiss the tears you cry." A child's voice speaks and it leads to an extended coda with a crescendo of guitars and keys, on a fractured time signature. The Gentle Giant-ish a cappella vox harmonies are a nice touch, and the isolated whistling.

Blue Angel is a steady melodic rock, gently sung with lyrics that focus on longing for paradise with the blue angle; "You show me the paradise, you are my hope, you are my heart, my blue angel."

The final track lasts almost 14 minutes, opening with piano runs, and the more progressive time signature on the album. The Hammond organ lines are fast and frenetic, and is reminiscent of Keith Emerson from that band. Indeed, there are references to Tarkus which is surprising after the melodic rock previous. It settles into a mod tempo jazz figure as the vocals enter.

Summary
2012 Light Years from Home is no doubt exploring areas not visited previously on other tracks, and it is a breath of fresh air that they have left their most adventurous music till last. It really is designed for headphones and one would gain the full experience if they concentrated on the lyrics as they have a powerful story to tell; one that seems to run as a theme on the album, preparing for the apocalyptic end times. Each song builds up this story and there does not seem to be a happy ending as, after all, not everything turns out like a fairytale. Though the lyrics have an optimistic ray of hope, "For you are light inside your dreams, Inside your dreams the sun will lead us, be ready to save the world, our reason to be here, the more we live, the more we learn, the more we fear, the more we lie, the spirit of imagination can lead us through the shadows, so let´s change the world." The symphonic strings and piano are strikingly like Emerson Lake & Palmer's Take a pebble, and then a synth solo like 'Karn Evil 9' enters with staccato Hammond stabs and an irregular synth rhythm. An extended hammering synth sound follows and some of the best keyboard wizardry from Eloy Fritsch.

Track listing

Musicians
Eloy Fritsch: Electronic keyboards, Organ, Minimoog, Bass guitar, vocals
Ruy Fritsch: Electric and acoustic guitars
Fabio Schneider: Drums, percussion
Gustavo Demarchi: Lead Vocal, Flute

References

2011 albums
Apocalypse (band) albums